Pinker Pinker was a notable Australian thoroughbred racehorse.

A daughter of Reset (AUS) from the mare Miss Marion (AUS), she was foaled in 2007 and was trained throughout her career by Greg Eurell.

Pinker Pinker showed above average ability from an early age with Group 1 placings in the AJC Oaks and Epsom Handicap.

Her biggest win was in the 2011 Cox Plate when ridden by Craig Williams.

In April 2012, when being prepared for the Queen of the Turf Stakes she suffered anaphylactic shock following an injection from veterinary staff and died.

References

Cox Plate winners
2007 racehorse births
2012 racehorse deaths
Racehorses bred in Australia
Thoroughbred family 4-c